The Joseph Elliston House, also known as the Cohen House, is a c. 1817 Federal-style center-hall house in Brentwood, Tennessee.

As of 1988, it had original weatherboard siding, and it has large exterior end limestone chimneys.

It was listed on the National Register of Historic Places in 1988.

References

Houses on the National Register of Historic Places in Tennessee
Houses in Williamson County, Tennessee
Federal architecture in Tennessee
Central-passage houses in Tennessee
Houses completed in 1817
National Register of Historic Places in Williamson County, Tennessee